Natalya Venediktovna Lisovskaya (born 16 July 1962) is a Soviet former athlete who competed mainly in shot put. Lisovskaya trained at Spartak in Moscow.

Career 
Born in Alegazy, Bashkir ASSR, Lisovskaya competed for the USSR in the 1988 Summer Olympics held in Seoul, South Korea where she won the gold medal. She also has the three farthest throws of all time by a female shot putter.

After her career, she gained French citizenship and competed between 1999 and 2002 at some local competitions in France.

Lisovskaya married men's hammer throw world record holder Yuriy Sedykh and has one daughter, Alexia. They live in Paris, France.

Doping 
Former head of the Russian Anti-doping laboratory Grigory Rodchenkov alluded to her doping being found but not reported by the laboratory in his book the Rodchenkov Affair.

References

External links 

1962 births
Living people
Soviet female shot putters
Spartak athletes
Athletes (track and field) at the 1988 Summer Olympics
Athletes (track and field) at the 1992 Summer Olympics
Olympic athletes of the Soviet Union
Olympic athletes of the Unified Team
Olympic gold medalists for the Soviet Union
World Athletics record holders
World Athletics Championships medalists
European Athletics Championships medalists
Medalists at the 1988 Summer Olympics
Olympic gold medalists in athletics (track and field)
Universiade medalists in athletics (track and field)
Goodwill Games medalists in athletics
Universiade gold medalists for the Soviet Union
CIS Athletics Championships winners
World Athletics Indoor Championships winners
World Athletics Championships winners
Russian State University of Physical Education, Sport, Youth and Tourism alumni
Medalists at the 1983 Summer Universiade
Medalists at the 1987 Summer Universiade
Competitors at the 1986 Goodwill Games
Competitors at the 1990 Goodwill Games
Friendship Games medalists in athletics